Adams Branch is a stream in Cass County, Missouri. It is a tributary of the South Grand River.

Adams Branch was named after William Adams, a pioneer citizen.

Course
Adams Branch rises about 3 miles northeast of Freeman, Missouri, in Cass County and then flows south to join the South Grand River about 2 miles southeast of Freeman.

Watershed
Adams Branch drains  of area, receives about 40.2 in/year of precipitation, has a wetness index of 447.51, and is about 15% forested.

See also
List of rivers of Missouri

References

Rivers of Cass County, Missouri
Rivers of Missouri
Missouri water resource region